The 2006 CIS Men's Soccer Championship Finals were held from 9 to 12 November 2006 at the University of Alberta in Edmonton, Alberta. It will consisted of 8 teams from the various conferences under the Canadian Interuniversity Sport.

All-Canadians
First Team (1–11) and Second Team (12–22) with school and hometown.

Nationals
Along with host Alberta Golden Bears, the teams that qualified for the National Finals are UNB Varsity Reds, Trinity Western Spartans, Montreal Carabins, Western Ontario Mustangs, St. Mary's Huskies, Toronto Varsity blues and Laval Rouge et Or.

U Sports men's soccer championship
CIS